Honda R&D Americas, Inc. (HRA) is an American division of Honda Motor Company that develops automobiles, motorcycles, all-terrain vehicles, outdoor power equipment; lawnmowers, boat outboard engines, and jet engines. It develops vehicles for Honda and Acura sales in conjunction with other global R&D centers.

Honda R&D Americas has 14 facilities in Canada and U.S., including Torrance, California, Raymond, Ohio; Detroit, Michigan; Denver, Colorado; Haw River, North Carolina; Cincinnati, Ohio; Los Angeles downtown; Burlington, North Carolina; Timmonsville, South Carolina; Grant-Valkaria, Florida; Toronto, Ontario and Halifax, Nova Scotia.

See also
Honda
Acura
HondaJet

References

External links
Honda R&D Americas Official Website
List of patents held by Honda R&D

Honda
Acura
Buildings and structures in Union County, Ohio